Sadia Islam Mou, mononymously known as Mou, is a Bangladeshi model and television actress. She became popular during the 1990s by appearing in tel
evision advertisements.

Career
Mou debuted into modeling in 1989 through the television advertisement on Mount Shampoo. In 1994, she started acting through the television drama Obhimane Onubhobe. She was a judge in lux superstar 2018. She along with popular model Adil Hossain Noble pair got immense popularity since mid 90s.

Personal life
Mou married Zahid Hasan, an actor and director. Together they have a daughter, Puspita and a son, Purno.

Works
 Obhimane Onubhobe (1994)
 Guum (2014)
 Uro Chiti (2018)
  Jatra Pother Golpo (2018)

References

External links

 

Living people
Bangladeshi female models
Bangladeshi television actresses
Bangladeshi film actresses
Year of birth missing (living people)
Place of birth missing (living people)